Alafia orientalis is a plant in the family Apocynaceae.

Description
Alafia orientalis grows as a liana. Its flowers feature a white corolla, sometimes reddish on the outside.

Distribution and habitat
Alafia orientalis is native to the Democratic Republic of the Congo, Uganda, Tanzania, Mozambique and Zimbabwe. Its habitat is dense forest.

References

orientalis
Plants described in 1903
Flora of the Democratic Republic of the Congo
Flora of Uganda
Flora of Tanzania
Flora of Mozambique
Flora of Zimbabwe
Taxa named by Émile Auguste Joseph De Wildeman